The 2022 Tro-Bro Léon was the 38th edition of Tro-Bro Léon, a one-day road cycling race in the northwestern French region of Brittany, that took place on 15 May 2022.

Teams 
Six of the eighteen UCI WorldTeams, ten UCI ProTeams, and six UCI Continental teams made up the 22 teams that participated in the race.

UCI WorldTeams

 
 
 
 
 
 

UCI ProTeams

 
 
 
 
 
 
 
 
 
 

UCI Continental Teams

Result

References

External links 
 

2022 in French sport
2022 UCI Europe Tour
2022 UCI ProSeries
2022
May 2022 sports events in France